Lonely at the Top: The Best of Randy Newman is a 1987 compilation album by Randy Newman. It was not issued in the U.S.

In 2000 it was voted number 476 in Colin Larkin's All Time Top 1000 Albums.

Track listing
All tracks written by Randy Newman

Original album

Reissues

Remastered and reissued on CD format in 1998 with four extra tracks ("Old Kentucky Home", "In Germany Before the War", "Christmas in Cape Town" and "My Life Is Good") inserted into the running order. Additionally, the order of  "Louisiana 1927" and "Marie" was reversed on the 1998 reissue.

References

1987 compilation albums
Randy Newman albums
Reprise Records compilation albums